Hsieh Su-wei and Monica Niculescu were the defending champions, but chose not to participate this year.

Kirsten Flipkens and Elise Mertens won the title, defeating Vera Lapko and Aryna Sabalenka in the final, 6–1, 6–3.

Seeds

Draw

Draw

References
Main Draw

Ladies Open Lugano - Doubles
Ladies Open Lugano
Lugano